The Union of the Russian People (URP) (СРН/SRN) is a loyalist far-right nationalist political party, the most important among Black-Hundredist monarchist political organizations in the Russian Empire between 1905 and 1917. Since 2000s organizational cells of the Union are being revived in Russia as well as Ukraine (Union of the Russian People (2005)).

Founded in October 1905, its aim was to rally the people behind 'Great Russian nationalism' and the Tsar, espousing anti-socialist, anti-liberal, and above all antisemitic views. By 1906 it had over 300,000 members. Its paramilitary armed bands, called the Black Hundreds, fought revolutionaries violently in the streets. Its leaders organised a series of political assassinations of deputies and other representatives of parties which supported the Russian Revolution of 1905.

The Union was dissolved in 1917 in the wake of the Revolution, and its leader, Alexander Dubrovin placed under arrest.

Some modern academic researchers view the Union of the Russian People as an early example of fascism.

Ideology and political views
The Union was the leading exponent of antisemitism in the wake of the 1905 Revolution. It has been described as 'an early Russian version of the Fascist movement', as it was anti-socialist, anti-liberal, and 'above all anti-Semitic'.

The Union of the Russian People called for the 'restoration of the popular autocracy', a concept they believed had existed before Russia had been taken over by 'intellectuals and Jews'. Antisemitism was brought into the URP by what became the organisation's ideological core, chairman Alexander Dubrovin, Vladimir Purishkevich, Pavel Krushevan, Pavel Bulatsel and some other 'radical temperament anti-Semitic rabble- rousers', who had seceded from the Russian Assembly. The methods of the Union were not what the Russian Assembly considered proper conduct. Save lawyer and journalist Bulatsel, another leading intellectual of the URP was B. V. Nikolsky, privatdozent (senior lecturer) at Petersburg University.

The Union was above all a movement of 'Great Russian nationalism'. Its very first aim it had declared to be a 'Great Russia, United and Indivisible'. Its nationalism was based on xenophobia and racism.

The Union also actively campaigned against Ukrainian self-determination and in particular, against the 'cult' of the popular Ukrainian poet Taras Shevchenko.

History

Creation
The Union of the Russian people was by far the most important of the extreme rightist groups formed in the wake of the 1905 Revolution. It was founded in October 1905 as a movement to mobilise and rally the masses against the Left, by the two 'minor government officials' Alexander Dubrovin and Vladimir Purishkevich. The idea to create the union originated between several public figures of Russia who entered its political arena before the 1905 Russian Revolution.

1905–06
At this meeting, they concurred with Dubrovin's idea to set up a political organization (Dubrovin opposed to calling it a party). In a couple of weeks initiators worked out an organisational structure, devised a program, and on  formally announced the founding of the Union of the Russian People. Dubrovin was elected its chairman.

The Union's Manifesto expressed a 'plebeian mistrust' of every political party, as well as the bureaucracy and the intelligentsia. The group looked at these as obstacles to 'the direct communion between the Tsar and his people'. This struck a deep chord with Nicholas II, who also shared the deep belief in re-establishment of autocratic personal rule, as had existed in the Muscovite state of the 1600s. It also stood for the russification of non-Russian citizens. The charter was adopted in August 1906.

Support
After the 1905 Revolution the Orthodox Church's conservative clergy members allied with extreme Rightist organisations, the Union of the Russian People being one of them, in opposing the liberals' further attempts at a church reform and extension of religious freedom and toleration. Several prominent, leading church members were also supportive of the organisation, among them the royal family's close friend and future Orthodox Saint John of Kronstadt, Iliodor the monk, and Bishop Hermogenes. Each local department of the Union of the Russian People had its own horugvs and icons, which were kept in local cathedrals or monasteries. The opening of the departments of the Union of the Russian People was always accompanied by solemn prayer services, which were served by local bishops, in the person of the latter, the Russian Church gave its official blessing to the Union of the Russian People and recommended the latter to its clerics. In fact, into the orbit of the Union of the Russian People the entire episcopate was involved. It also had support from leading members of the court and government, one of the supporters being the Minister of the Interior Nikolay Maklakov.

Tsar Nicholas II was highly supportive of the Union and patronised it: he wore the badge of the Union, and wished the Union and its leaders 'total success' in their efforts to unite what he called 'loyal Russians' in defence of the autocracy. The Tsar also gave orders to provide funds for the Union, and the Ministry of the Interior complied by funding the Union's newspapers, and also providing them with weapons through secret channels. Dubrovin was also in contact with senior officials and the secret services of Russia. Minister of the Interior Pyotr Durnovo was completely in the know about the foundation of the Union while his subordinates actively worked upon creation of an open organisation to counteract the influence of revolutionaries and liberals among the masses. Around the same the head of the political section of gendarmes department Pyotr Rachkovsky reported his chief, Colonel (later General)  about such attempts and proposed Gerasimov to introduce him to Dubrovin. Their meeting took place in late October 1905 in the apartment of Rachkovsky.

With powerful administrative support and funding at their disposal, the Union of the Russian People managed to organise and conduct its first mass public event less than a fortnight after its creation. An orchestra was playing, a church choir sang "Praise God" and "Tsar Divine"; leaders of the URP (Dubrovin, Purishkevich, Bulatsel, Nikolsky) addressed the mob from a rostrum erected in the centre of the arena. Special guests from the "Russian Assembly": Prince M. N. Volkonsky, journalist from Novoye Vremya Nikolai Engelhardt and two bishops also welcomed the new party with their speeches.

Members of the Tsar's court, like Grand Duke Nikolai Nikolayevich, Alexander Trepov, and other government officials and clergy members 'unquestionably welcomed a movement such as this'. Sergei Witte was a rare occasion among high-ranking officials being 'unequivocally hostile to the URP' (in his memoirs he calls Dubrovin a 'high-handed and abusive leader').

Street fighting
The Union was horrified by Tsar Nicholas II's refusal to strike down harshly on the Leftist revolutionaries. The Union, therefore, decided to organise this for the Tsar, and organised paramilitary bands, which came to be known as the 'Black Hundreds' by the democrats, to fight revolutionaries in the streets. These militant groups marched through the streets holding in their pockets knives and brass knuckles, and carrying religious symbols such as icons and crosses and imperial ones such as patriotic banners and portraits of Tsar Nicholas II. They marched through the streets fighting to 'revenge themselves' and restore the old hierarchy of society and races. Their numbers were swelled by thousands of criminals who had been released as a part of the October amnesty, who looked at it as a chance of violence and pillaging. Often encouraged by police officers, they beat up suspected democratic sympathisers, making them kneel before tsarist portraits or making them kiss the Imperial flag. In October 1906, they formed a Black-Hundredist organisation called Russian People United.

1906–1917

By 1906 the Union had a total of 300,000 members spread over 1,000 different branches. Most of their supporters came from the social stratum which 'had either lost – or were afraid of losing – their petty status' in society as a result of reform and modernisation – much like the supporters of fascism – among them urbanised peasants working as labourers, policemen and other low-ranking state officials who risked losing their power, and small shopkeepers and artisans who were losing the competition against big business and industry. By 1907 it is said about up to 900 local URP branches existed in many cities, towns and even villages. Apart from the ones named above, the largest were in Kiev, Saratov and Astrakhan; Volhynian Governorate is also mentioned among the largest by the representation of the URP.

The Union opposed Stolypin's reforms, being supporters of the 'legitimist bloc' which, through its support in the court, church, nobility and the Union, defeated nearly all of Stolypin's reform proposals.

The Union also became the main instigator (through meetings, gatherings, lectures, manifestations and mass public prayers) of the pogroms against Jews (especially in 1906 in Gomel, Yalta, Białystok, Odessa, Sedlets and other cities), in which members of the URP often took an active part. In the wake of the Beiliss Affair, Nicholas II used the large wave of antisemitism in the population, spread and rallied by groups such as the Union of the Russian People, to rally support for his regime. It was one of the first to extreme Rightist groups which had proclaimed a charge of ritual murder in the so-called Beiliss Affair, and supported the anti-Semitic persecution throughout the trial of Menahem Beiliss.

In 1908 URP members of the clergy claimed through a petition the right to carry weapons; this petition, however, was denied.

In 1908–10, the infighting in the URP broke the organisation into several smaller entities, which were in constant conflict with each other: Union of Archangel Michael, Union of the Russian People, Dubrovin's All-Russian Union of the Russian People in Petersburg, etc. After the February Revolution of 1917, all of the Black-Hundredist organisations were forcefully dissolved and banned.

Soon after the February Revolution of 1917, the URP was suspended and its leader Alexander Dubrovin was arrested.

Party leaders and organisation
The supreme body of URP was called the Main Council. Its chairman Alexander Dubrovin had two deputies: noble landowner and future Duma Deputy Vladimir Purishkevich and engineer A. I. Trishatny. From six other board members (Pavel Bulatzel, George Butmi, P. P. Surin and others) four belonged to the merchant estate, and two were peasants by origin. A merchant from Petersburg I. I. Baranov was the treasurer of the URP, and barrister Sergei Trishatny (elder brother of a Deputy Chairman) performed as secretary.

Later the Main Council increased to 12 members, among which S. D. Chekalov, M. N. Zelensky, Ye. D. Golubev, N. N. Yazykov, G. A. Slipak are mentioned.

Newspapers
URP's chief newspaper was Russkoe znamya (Russian Banner), a newspaper which first published notorious "Protocols of the Elders of Zion". In provincial Russia The Pochayev Circular was the most popular of the URP newspapers. URP also printed its propaganda materials in Moskovskiye Vedomosti ("Moscow News"), Grazhdanin ("Citizen"), Kievlyanin ("Kievan") and others.

Modern revival and current activity
The Union of the Russian People has seen a revival in Russia since 2005 and has several followers and 17 offices in large cities. The first chairman of the refounded group was Vyacheslav Klykov. The Union's main activities can be described as national patriotism with a strong emphasis on the Russian Orthodox Church and revival of Russian traditions gone into the past after the October Revolution.

The Union of the Russian People has also been noticed to exist in Ukraine since at least 2010.

See also
Black Hundreds

Bibliography

References

External links
Programme and Statute of the Union of the Russian People

1905 establishments in the Russian Empire
1917 disestablishments in Russia
Antisemitism in the Russian Empire
Conservative parties in Russia
Defunct nationalist parties in Russia
Eastern Orthodoxy and far-right politics
Far-right political parties in Russia
Monarchist parties in Russia
Political parties disestablished in 1917
Political parties established in 1905
Political parties in the Russian Empire
Political parties of the Russian Revolution
Russian nationalist organizations
Defunct conservative parties
National conservative parties
Social conservative parties
Eastern Orthodox political parties
Anti-communist parties
Right-wing parties in Europe
Defunct far-right parties